Paolo Pico (1563 – 1614) was a Roman Catholic prelate who served as Bishop of Vulturara e Montecorvino (1613–1614).

Biography
Paolo Pico was born in Burgi San Sepulchri, Italy in 1563 and ordained a priest in the Order of Preachers. On 15 Jul 1613, he was appointed during the papacy of Pope Paul V as Bishop of Vulturara e Montecorvino. On 15 Sep 1613, he was consecrated bishop by Felice Centini, Bishop of Mileto, with Antonio d'Aquino, Bishop of Sarno, and Sigismondo Gambacorta, Bishop of Telese o Cerreto Sannita, serving as co-consecrators. He served as Bishop of Vulturara e Montecorvino until his death in 1614.

References

External links and additional sources 
 (for Chronology of Bishops) 
 (for Chronology of Bishops) 

17th-century Italian Roman Catholic bishops
1563 births
1614 deaths
Bishops appointed by Pope Paul V
Dominican bishops